The Central Secretariat of the Chinese Communist Party, officially, the Secretariat of the Central Committee of the Communist Party of China, is a body serving the Politburo of the Chinese Communist Party and its Standing Committee. The secretariat is mainly responsible for carrying out routine operations of the Politburo and the coordination of organizations and stakeholders to achieve tasks as set out by the Politburo. It is empowered by the Politburo to make routine day-to-day decisions on issues of concern in accordance with the decisions of the Politburo, but it must consult the Politburo on substantive matters. The de facto head of the Secretariat is First Secretary.

The secretariat was set up in January 1934. It is nominally headed by the CCP general secretary, though the position of "General Secretary" was not always one and the same as the top party leader. Secretaries of the secretariat (Shujichu Shuji) are considered some of the most important political positions in the Communist Party and in contemporary China, more generally. Each secretary of the secretariat is generally in charge of one of the major party departments directly under the jurisdiction of the Central Committee. By protocol, its members are ranked above the vice chairmen of the National People's Congress as well as State Councilors. The General Secretary presides over the work of the secretariat.

History 
The Secretariat of the Central Committee was formed in January 1934 at the 5th Plenary Session of the 6th National Congress of the Chinese Communist Party, which was held in Shanghai. On March 20, 1943, the Politburo, in a joint decision, decreed that the secretariat will be responsible for carrying out the work of the Politburo according to the general policy framework determined by the Politburo, and that it is vested with the power to make decisions within this general framework.

In 1956, the party created the position of the "General Secretary" to head its secretariat. The position is not that of the foremost leader in the party, which, at the time, was the "Chairman of the Central Committee". Rather, the general secretary was in charge of carrying out the day-to-day work of the Communist Party's Politburo. Its inaugural general secretary was Deng Xiaoping, with prominent political figures such as Peng Zhen and Tan Zhenlin being secretaries.

During the Cultural Revolution, the post of general secretary as well as the secretariat itself completely ceased to function. Beginning at the 9th Party Congress, party documents made no mention of the secretariat. The body was restored after the Cultural Revolution in February 1980, with Hu Yaobang occupying the position of first-ranked secretary, which is analogous to the position formerly called the "General Secretary". Since its reinstatement, the composition of the secretariat has varied between 6 and 12 members. Wan Li, Hu Qili, Hu Jintao, Zeng Qinghong, Xi Jinping, and Liu Yunshan have all successively held the position of the first-ranked Secretary of the secretariat.

The secretaries of the secretariat are ranked highly in the order of precedence among "Party and State Leaders". The secretaries rank under the Politburo, but ranks above the Vice-chairpersons of the National People's Congress Standing Committee.

List of First Secretaries

List of secretaries 
 6th CCP Central Committee
 From the 5th Plenary Session to the March 1943 Politburo meeting: Bo Gu, Zhang Wentian, Zhou Enlai, Xiang Ying (Until his death in January 1941)
 Since the Zunyi Conference: Mao Zedong (Chairman of the Secretariat since March 1943), Kang Sheng (Took office December 1937)
 Since the March 1943 Politburo meeting: Liu Shaoqi, Ren Bishi
 7th CCP Central Committee
 Mao Zedong (Chairman of the Secretariat), Zhu De, Liu Shaoqi (Acting Chairman of the Secretariat, August - October 1945), Ren Bishi (Until his death in October 1950), Chen Yun (Alternate secretary from August 1945, promoted from alternate secretary October 1950)
 Alternate secretary: Peng Zhen (From August 1945)
8th CCP Central Committee
 Deng Xiaoping, Peng Zhen (Until the May 1966 Expanded Politburo Meeting), Wang Jiaxiang, Tan Zhenlin, Tan Zheng (Until the 10th Plenary Session), Huang Kecheng (Until the 10th Plenary Session), Li Xuefeng
Since the 5th Plenary Session: Li Fuchun, Li Xiannian
Since the 10th Plenary Session: Lu Dingyi (Until the May 1966 Expanded Politburo Meeting), Kang Sheng, Luo Ruiqing (Until the May 1966 Expanded Politburo Meeting)
Since the May 1966 Expanded Politburo Meeting: Tao Zhu (Executive Secretary), Ye Jianying, Xie Fuzhi, Liu Ningyi
Alternate secretaries: Liu Lantao, Yang Shangkun (Until the May 1966 Expanded Politburo Meeting), Hu Qiaomu
9th CCP Central Committee: Not appointed
10th CCP Central Committee: Not appointed
11th CCP Central Committee
Wan Li, Wang Renzhong, Fang Yi, Gu Mu, Song Renqiong, Yu Qiuli, Yang Dezhi, Hu Qiaomu, Yao Yilin, Peng Chong, Xi Zhongxun (Since the 6th Plenary Session)
12th CCP Central Committee
Hu Qili, Wan Li, Yu Qiuli, Chen Pixian, Deng Liqun, Yang Yong (Until his death in January 1983)
Until the 4th Plenary Session: Xi Zhongxun, Gu Mu, Yao Yilin
Since the 4th Plenary Session: Qiao Shi (Promoted from alternate secretary), Tian Jiyun, Li Peng, Hao Jianxiu (Promoted from alternate secretary), Wang Zhaoguo
13th CCP Central Committee
Qiao Shi
Until the 4th Plenary Session: Hu Qili, Rui Xingwen, Yan Mingfu
Since the 4th Plenary Session: Li Ruihuan, Ding Guangen, Yang Baibing
Alternate secretary: Wen Jiabao
14th CCP Central Committee
Hu Jintao, Ding Guangen, Wei Jianxing, Wen Jiabao, Ren Jianxin
Since the 4th Plenary Session: Wu Bangguo, Jiang Chunyun
15th CCP Central Committee
Hu Jintao, Wei Jianxing, Ding Guangen, Zhang Wannian, Luo Gan, Wen Jiabao, Zeng Qinghong
16th CCP Central Committee 
Zeng Qinghong, Liu Yunshan, Zhou Yongkang, He Guoqiang, Wang Gang, Xu Caihou, He Yong
17th CCP Central Committee
Xi Jinping, Liu Yunshan, Li Yuanchao, He Yong, Ling Jihua, Wang Huning
18th CCP Central Committee
Liu Yunshan, Liu Qibao, Zhao Leji, Li Zhanshu, Du Qinglin, Zhao Hongzhu, and Yang Jing (Mongol).
19th CCP Central Committee
Wang Huning, Ding Xuexiang, Yang Xiaodu, Chen Xi, Guo Shengkun, Huang Kunming, You Quan.
20th CCP Central Committee
Cai Qi, Shi Taifeng, Li Ganjie, Li Shulei, Chen Wenqing, Liu Jinguo, Wang Xiaohong.

See also 
 First Secretary of the Chinese Communist Party
 General Office of the Chinese Communist Party
 Grand Secretariat (Imperial court of China)

References 

Chinese Communist Party
Secretariats of communist parties